Frederick Austin Glover (January 5, 1928 – August 16, 2001) was a Canadian professional ice hockey player and coach. He played 92 games in the National Hockey League (NHL) with the Detroit Red Wings and Chicago Black Hawks between 1949 and 1952, though most of his career, which lasted from 1947 to 1968, was with the Cleveland Barons of the American Hockey League (AHL). After his playing career he coached the Barons for several years, and coached in the NHL with the Oakland Seals/California Golden Seals and Los Angeles Kings between 1968 and 1974, also serving as general manager of the Golden Seals on two occasions during that time. He was the brother of Howie Glover, who also played in the NHL.

Playing career
Glover played junior hockey in his native Toronto. At age 21, he signed his first professional hockey contract and debuted with the American Hockey League's Indianapolis Capitals, leading his team in scoring as a rookie. In 1950, he won the first of his record five Calder Cup championships, and he received his first NHL promotion during the same year. He scored a career high 48 goals in 1951. Glover played 54 games with the Detroit Red Wings in 1951–52, but he was not active during the playoffs as the Wings won the Stanley Cup. Glover was traded to the Cleveland Barons in 1953, and he became the most celebrated player in team history. In fifteen seasons with Cleveland, he won four Calder Cups and three league MVP awards. He scored a career high 107 points in 1960. He retired in 1968 as the AHL's  career leader in games played (1,201), goals (520), assists (814), points (1,334) and penalty minutes (2,402).

Coaching career
Between 1962 and 1968, Glover served a dual role as both star player and head coach. He won his 1964 championship while working in this capacity. He took a job as an NHL coach in 1968 as he joined the Oakland Seals. As a rookie coach, he was honored by The Sporting News as coach of the year, as he led his second year expansion franchise to a 22-point improvement over their initial season. However the team's performance diminished in each of the next two seasons, and he was fired three games into the 1971–72 campaign. Just weeks later, he became the first coach to manage two teams in one season, as he joined the Los Angeles Kings and finished out their season after the franchise had fired coach Larry Regan. He returned to the Seals in 1972 as a mid-season replacement, coaching the team to a last place finish, before being fired during the next season.

Awards and honors
1952  Stanley Cup  Championship  (Detroit Red Wings)
Five-time 1954  Calder Cup winner  (Indianapolis Capitals - 1950, Cleveland Barons - 1953, 1954, 1957, 1964)
Two-time John B. Sollenberger Trophy winner - 1957, 1960.
Three-time Les Cunningham Award winner - 1960, 1962, 1964
Number (9) retired by the Cleveland Monsters for his career with the Barons
AHL Hall of Fame inductee (class of 2006)
 Greater Cleveland Sports Hall of Fame, 2008 inductee (along with his brother Howie)

Career statistics

Regular season and playoffs

NHL coaching record

References

Bibliography

External links
 
AHL Hall of Fame bio
Picture of Fred Glover's Name on the 1952 Stanley Cup Plaque

1928 births
2001 deaths
California Golden Seals executives
California Golden Seals coaches
Canadian ice hockey centres
Canadian ice hockey coaches
Chicago Blackhawks players
Cleveland Barons (1937–1973) coaches
Cleveland Barons (1937–1973) players
Cleveland Barons (NHL) coaches
Detroit Red Wings players
Indianapolis Capitals players
Los Angeles Kings coaches
Omaha Knights (USHL) players
St. Louis Flyers players
Ice hockey people from Toronto
Stanley Cup champions